The New Zealand women's national cricket team toured Australia in July 2007. They first played against Australia in one Twenty20 International, which Australia won by one run. The two sides then played in five One Day Internationals, which were to contest the Rose Bowl. Australia won the series 3–2.

Squads

Only WT20I

WODI Series

1st ODI

2nd ODI

3rd ODI

4th ODI

5th ODI

References

External links
New Zealand Women tour of Australia 2007 from Cricinfo

Women's international cricket tours of Australia
2007 in Australian cricket
New Zealand women's national cricket team tours